Richard Marlon Calloway (born December 12, 1966) is an American former professional basketball player. He played one season in the National Basketball Association (NBA) for the Sacramento Kings during the 1990–91 season. Born in Cincinnati, Ohio, he attended Indiana University and transferred to the University of Kansas in 1988. Calloway was a 6'6" 180 lb forward.

Calloway was selected in the 1990 CBA Draft by the Omaha Racers, and played for the Columbus Horizon and Rochester Renegade in that league.  He also played professionally in Argentina and Poland.

Calloway is now a partner in swimming pool construction company, Beyond Blue Pools, in the Houston area.

Notes

External links

1966 births
Living people
American expatriate basketball people in Argentina
American expatriate basketball people in Poland
American expatriate basketball people in the Philippines
American men's basketball players
Basketball players from Cincinnati
Columbus Horizon players
Indiana Hoosiers men's basketball players
Kansas Jayhawks men's basketball players
McDonald's High School All-Americans
Parade High School All-Americans (boys' basketball)
Philippine Basketball Association imports
Rochester Renegade players
Sacramento Kings players
San Miguel Beermen players
Shooting guards
Small forwards
Undrafted National Basketball Association players